Buddhaguhya (fl. c.700 CE) was a Vajrayana Buddhist scholar-monk. He taught at Nālandā and Vārāṇasī, and spent time in meditation near Mount Kailash. Vimalamitra was one of his students.

A major commentary by Buddhaguhya of the Mahavairocana Tantra was written in 760 and is preserved in Tibetan. Hodge translates it into English alongside the text itself. Apart from his commentary on the Maha-Vairocana-Abhisambodhi Tantra, we know little of Buddhaguhya.

Buddhaguhya is held to have received teachings from Lilavajra.

References

Indian Buddhist monks
Monks of Nalanda
Tibetan Buddhists from India